The Dian Fossey Gorilla Fund International (originally the Digit Fund) is a charity for the protection of endangered mountain gorillas. The Digit Fund was created by Dr. Dian Fossey in 1978 for the sole purpose of financing her anti-poaching patrols and preventing further poaching of the mountain gorillas. Fossey studied at her Karisoke Research Center in the Virunga Volcanoes of Rwanda. The non-profit fund was named in memory of Fossey's favourite gorilla, Digit, who was decapitated by poachers for the offer of US$20 by a Hutu merchant who specialized in selling gorilla heads as trophies and gorilla hands as ashtrays to tourists.

Background
Sometime during the day on New Year's Eve 1977, Fossey's favourite gorilla, Digit, was killed by poachers. As the sentry of study group 4, he defended the group against six poachers and their dogs, who ran across the gorilla study group while checking antelope traplines. Digit took five spear wounds in ferocious self-defense and managed to kill one of the poachers' dogs, allowing the other 13 members of his group to escape. Digit was decapitated, and his hands cut off for an ashtray, for the price of US$20. After his mutilated body was discovered by research assistant Ian Redmond, Fossey's group captured one of the killers. He revealed the names of his five accomplices, three of whom were later imprisoned.

Fossey subsequently created the Digit Fund to raise money for anti-poaching patrols. It was renamed to the "Dian Fossey Gorilla Fund International" in 1992.

Fossey mostly opposed the efforts of the international organizations, which she felt inefficiently directed their funds towards more equipment for Rwandan park officials, some of whom were alleged to have ordered some of the gorilla poachings in the first place. She commented on the profound effect that Digit's death had had on her approach to conservationism: "I have tried not to allow myself to think of Digit's anguish, pain and the total comprehension he must have suffered in knowing what humans were doing to him. From that moment on, I came to live within an insulated part of myself."

Financing
Busy with her research in Africa, Fossey enlisted the help of her friends, primatologist Richard Wrangham and TV presenter David Attenborough, who approached conservation organizations located in the UK including the Fauna Preservation Society (FPS) and the International Union for Conservation of Nature, which declined Fossey's request in favor of supporting an approach emphasizing tourism to Rwanda. At Wrangham's request, FPS launched an appeal in response to Digit's death, which the group subsequently named the Mountain Gorilla Fund for better name recognition; FPS chose to direct the funds to Rwandan park officials rather than Fossey's on-the-ground efforts. Fossey became frustrated as many international donors contributed funds in memory of Digit that were directed by international conservation organizations towards the construction of roads or the purchase of new vehicles for park conservation officials, who in many cases were bribed by poachers to look the other way from illegal activities and, according to Fossey, rarely ventured into the park at all. When payments for Fossey's articles on Digit's death were accidentally directed to the FPS Mountain Gorilla Fund rather than to her, FPS declined to redirect the money towards Fossey or her initiative. To coordinate donations to Rwandan authorities, FPS enlisted Fossey's former student and apprentice and one of her chief detractors, Sandy Harcourt.

On her first trip to the United States after the poachings of Group 4, Fossey enlisted the aid of the National Geographic Society, which pledged $5,000, as did the World Wildlife Fund, over the objections of some of its members who had heard rumors of Fossey's anti-poaching patrols and other tactics she used against poaching. Fossey asked her friend Robinson McIlvaine, the head of the nonprofit African Wildlife Leadership Foundation, to serve as secretary-treasurer of the Digit Fund until she could find a salaried executive director to assume control over the operations. McIlvaine partnered with the International Primate Protection League, the Digit Fund, and his own African Wildlife Leadership Foundation asking for funds, to be made out to the AWLF. The Digit Fund received none of the money, and McIlvaine suggested to Fossey that the Digit Fund could be folded into AWLF, which Fossey declined; McIlvaine resigned as secretary-treasurer of the Digit Fund.

Dr. Shirley McGreal, head of the International Primate Protection League (IPPL), had allowed IPPL's co-sponsorship of the letter only to help the Digit Fund and blames the misunderstanding on Fossey being taken advantage of in the wake of her gorillas' deaths and never viewing the gorillas' deaths as a way for her to personally profit. McGreal volunteered to serve as secretary-treasurer in the wake of McIlvaine's resignation from the post. Through the seeming partnership of AWLF/Digit Fund, funds contributed to the Digit Fund by philanthropist Gordon Hanes and by students under the supervision of primatologist Geza Teleki came under the auspices of AWLF, not the Digit Fund. The US ambassador to Rwanda submitted a proposal in 1980 for Karisoke Research Center to be removed from Fossey's control and placed under a mountain gorilla consortium led by AWLF while Fossey was in America finishing her book.

While she had lost control of funds raised in Britain after Digit's death to the Fauna Preservation Society, Fossey managed to keep the control of the Digit Fund in the United States until her death. After Fossey was murdered, the Digit Fund was renamed the Dian Fossey Gorilla Fund and remained headquartered in the UK until the summer of 2006, when the UK and US branches split: the UK organization was briefly renamed the Dian Fossey Gorilla Fund Europe
then The Gorilla Organization, (gorillas.org) and the US side of the organization became the Dian Fossey Gorilla Fund International (gorillafund.org).

Activities
Through the Digit Fund, Fossey financed patrols to destroy poachers' traps among the mountains of Virunga. In four months in 1979, the Fossey patrol consisting of four African staffers destroyed 987 poachers' traps in the research area's vicinity. The official Rwandan national park guards, consisting of 24 staffers, did not catch any poachers' traps during the same period.

The Dian Fossey Gorilla Fund International continues to operate the Karisoke Research Center, which Fossey founded in 1967, with daily gorilla monitoring and patrols.

References

External links 

 

Animal welfare organisations based in Rwanda
Nature conservation in Rwanda
Organizations established in 1978
Gorillas
Poaching
Primate conservation